The Ventadour Lake is a freshwater body of the southeastern portion of the Eeyou Istchee James Bay (municipality), in Jamésie, in the administrative region of Nord-du-Québec, in the province of Quebec, in Canada.

This body of water extends in the townships of Ventadour and Feuquières. Forestry is the main economic activity of the sector. Recreational tourism activities come second.

The hydrographic slope of Lake Ventadour is accessible via the forest road R1032 (North-South direction) which passes on the west side of lakes Gabriel and Ventadour; in addition, this road crosses the Ventadour River south of Ventadour Lake to merge south on route 212 which passes on the south side of the Ventadour River, connecting Obedjiwan to La Tuque.

The surface of Ventadour Lake is usually frozen from early November to mid-May, however, safe ice circulation is generally from mid-November to mid-April.

Geography

Toponymy
The name "Lac Ventadour" was officialized on December 5, 1968 by the Commission de toponymie du Québec, when it was created.

Notes and references

See also 

Eeyou Istchee James Bay
Lakes of Nord-du-Québec
Nottaway River drainage basin